"Bound For Glory" is a song by Australian singer Angry Anderson. The song was released in August 1990 as the lead single from Anderson's studio album Blood from Stone. It peaked at number 11 on the ARIA charts.

AFL Anthem
The song was featured in a range of advertisements, and is now the theme music for the SYN radio program Bound for Glory. It subsequently was named the unofficial anthem of the AFL and performed at the 1991 AFL Grand Final at Waverley Park between Hawthorn and West Coast on a vehicle that resembled The Batmobile. The song was later counted down on Australia TV show 20 to 1 Greatest Sporting Anthems.

It was later noted he performed it live, but dramatically out of tune. The day was also memorable for the half-time entertainment which featured a parade of sporting celebrities in Ford Capris. The entertainment has been the subject of derision, and footage of the performance featured in a 2008 Carlton and United Breweries satirical television advertisement, with a caption stating "Carlton Draught. Proud supporter of footy since 1877 (Except for 1991)".

Charts

Year-end charts

References

1990 singles
1990 songs
Number-one singles in Australia
Pete Waterman Entertainment singles
Mushroom Records singles